The first series of the Israeli version of The Singer in the Mask premiered on Channel 12 on 23 September 2020 and concluded on 5 December 2020. The series was won by actor and singer Tzachi Halevy as "Rooster" with singer and children's star Rinat Gabay finishing second as "Dragonfly" and judoka Or Sasson finishing third as "Falafel".

Panelists and host 

The show is hosted by the television presenter Ido Rosenblum, with the judging panel comprising the journalist Ofira Asayag, the comedian Shahar Hason, the musical pop duo Static & Ben El Tavori, and the director Tzedi Tzarfati.

Guest panelists
Throughout the first season, various guest judges appeared alongside the original, for one or two episodes.

These guest panelists have included:

Contestants

Episodes

Episode 1 (September 23)

Episode 2 (September 29)

Episode 3 (October 1)

Episode 4/5 (October 4/5)

Episode 6/7 (October 12/13)

Episode 8/9 (October 18/19)

Episode 10 (October 26)

Episode 11/12 (November 1/2)

Episode 13/14 (November 8/9)

Episode 15/16 (November 15/16)

Episode 17/18 (November 21/22)

Episode 19 - Semifinal (November 28)

Episode 20 - Final (December 5)

References

Notes

External links
 

2020 Israeli television seasons
The Singer in the Mask